Pilembera (also Romanized as Pīlemberā and Pīlam Barā; also known as Pīlamīrah, Pilamirakh, Pīleh Mīreh, and Pīlemberā-ye Bālā) is a village in the Northern region of Dinachal Rural District, Pareh Sar District, Rezvanshahr County, Gilan Province, Iran. At the 2006 census, its population was 258, in 65 families.

References 

Populated places in Rezvanshahr County